Kaylum Boshier (born 9 April 1999 in New Zealand) is a New Zealand rugby union player who plays for the  in Super Rugby. His playing position is flanker. He was named in the Chiefs squad for the 2021 Super Rugby Aotearoa season. He was also a member of the  2020 Mitre 10 Cup squad.

Boshier also plays cricket, and was named as the captain of New Zealand's squad for the 2018 Under-19 Cricket World Cup.

Reference list

External links
itsrugby.co.uk profile
 

1999 births
New Zealand rugby union players
Living people
Rugby union flankers
New Zealand cricketers
Taranaki rugby union players
Chiefs (rugby union) players
Rugby union locks
Rugby union number eights
Rugby union players from New Plymouth